Providence (formerly known as Hells Half Acre) is an unincorporated community in Caswell County, North Carolina, United States. Providence has a post office with ZIP code 27315.

The small town annually hosts the "Spring Fling", a two-day event held on a weekend in late April or early May on the grounds of the Providence Volunteer Fire Department. It features rides for kids, food, crafts, fireworks, and nationally known entertainment. "The Gym", a full-size gymnasium originally built for the now defunct Piedmont Academy but now owned and maintained by Covenant Reformed Baptist Church, is generally available for public use. Every Sunday evening area youth gather for basketball games.

References

Unincorporated communities in Caswell County, North Carolina
Unincorporated communities in North Carolina